Plasma ball may refer to:

 Plasma globe, a manmade, ball-shaped plasma device
 Ball lightning, a natural phenomenon
 Star, a sphere of plasma held together by its own gravity
 The projectile of some plasma weapons

See also
 Plasma (disambiguation)